In algebraic geometry, the theorem on formal functions states the following:
Then for each  the canonical (continuous) map:

is an isomorphism of (topological) -modules, where

The canonical map is one obtained by passage to limit.

The theorem is used to deduce some other important theorems: Stein factorization and a version of Zariski's main theorem that says that a proper birational morphism into a normal variety is an isomorphism. Some other corollaries (with the notations as above) are:

Corollary: For any , topologically,

Corollary: Let r be such that  for all . Then

Corollay: For each , there exists an open neighborhood U of s such that

Corollary: If , then  is connected for all .

The theorem also leads to the Grothendieck existence theorem, which gives an equivalence between the category of coherent sheaves on a scheme and the category of coherent sheaves on its formal completion (in particular, it yields algebralizability.)

Finally, it is possible to weaken the hypothesis in the theorem; cf. Illusie. According to Illusie (pg. 204), the proof given in EGA III is due to Serre. The original proof (due to Grothendieck) was never published.

The construction of the canonical map 
Let the setting be as in the lede. In the proof one uses the following alternative definition of the canonical map.

Let  be the canonical maps. Then we have the base change map of -modules
.
Since  is also coherent (as f is proper), doing the same identification, the above reads:
.

where  are as before. One can verify that the composition of the two maps is the same map in the lede. (cf. EGA III-1, section 4)

Notes

References

Further reading 

Theorems in algebraic geometry